Lynn J. Good is chair, president and chief executive officer of Duke Energy, a Fortune 500 company. Good is an Ohio native and graduated from Miami University where she earned a BS in Systems Analysis and in Accounting (1981).

Early life and education
Good grew up in Fairfield, Ohio. Her father was a math teacher who later became a high school principal. She earned degrees in accounting and systems analysis from Miami University of Ohio.

Early career
Good became an auditor at the Cincinnati branch of Arthur Andersen & Co. While at Andersen, Good broke the barrier to females playing major roles in auditing when she participated in the audit of Andersen's most prestigious account, Cincinnati Gas & Electric. Good rose to supervise that audit, and in 1992 she became one of Andersen's few women partners. She was also a partner for a time at Deloitte.

Cinergy
Following the collapse of Arthur Andersen in 2002, Good joined Cinergy Corp. as senior vice president of accounting and finance. In 2005, Good was named executive vice president and chief financial officer of Cinergy. In 2006, following the merger of Cinergy into Duke Energy, Good was named senior vice president and treasurer of Duke in the company's Charlotte, North Carolina, headquarters. She went on to head the unregulated commercial business. Good was named Duke's executive vice president and chief financial officer as of July 2009. She began to make large investments in renewable energy such as wind and solar facilities that sell their power to utilities and towns.

Duke Energy
In 2011 Duke of Charlotte and Progress Energy of Raleigh agreed to merge. The deal stipulated that Progress CEO Bill Johnson was to replace Duke CEO Jim Rogers. But in June 2012, on the day that the deal closed, the board fired Johnson and re-hired Rogers instead. North Carolina regulators, following an investigation, reached an agreement with Duke in which the company was required to choose a new CEO by the middle of 2013. Good was selected by a board composed of both Duke and Progress members.
Lynn Good became CEO of Duke Energy on July 1, 2013. Good was also elected to the Duke board. In 2016, she was elected chairman of the board. In 2018, Duke Energy awarded Good just under $14 million in total compensation.

Good is one of the most highly compensated women executives in the United States.

Energy policy positions

Carbon capture and storage 
The Center for Strategic & International Studies (CSIS) held a wide-ranging interview of Good on June 21, 2018; among the topics were carbon capture and sequestration. Carbon capture and storage technology can capture up to 90 percent of carbon dioxide (CO2) emissions made from a fossil fuels electricity generation plant, thus releasing much less carbon dioxide into the atmosphere. Good told CSIS that the carbon capture and sequestration process was not quite ready for general use, even though it has potential for keeping fossil fuels in the power-generation mix. According to Daily Energy Insider, "On paper, a gas or coal plant that does not release carbon dioxide into the air would be a logical asset to fill in any lags in purely green power production”, but Good indicated that while Duke was still collaborating on various research projects involving carbon capture, the big breakthroughs necessary to launch a commercially viable carbon-capture plant were not yet in sight."

Other affiliations
Good was a member of the board of the Cincinnati Ballet for about eight years, from the 1990s, and has been a member of the board of directors at Boeing since 2015.

References

20th-century American businesspeople
American women chief executives
Businesspeople from Ohio
Miami University alumni
Duke Energy people
Deloitte people
American chief financial officers
American chairpersons of corporations
Women corporate directors
21st-century American businesspeople
American chief executives of Fortune 500 companies
American chief executives of energy companies
Boeing people
Living people
Year of birth missing (living people)
Auditors
Women accountants
Women chief financial officers
20th-century American businesswomen
21st-century American businesswomen